Ivan Volansky (1857–1926) was a Ukrainian priest who organized the first Greek Catholic parish in the United States.

Before his arrival, the Ukrainian Greek Catholic immigrants attended the local Latin Rite Roman Catholic churches.  
He arrived in Shenandoah, Pennsylvania in 1884 after Ukrainian immigrants petitioned the Metropolitan of Lviv for their own priest.  Volansky encountered difficulty being recognized by the local Roman Catholics since he was married.

He soon helped establish several other parishes, some in Pennsylvania and others as far away as New Jersey and Minnesota.  Volansky was involved with the building of many churches and cooperative stores, and also the organization of a fraternal society, choir, school, and a newspaper Ameryka.

His work has been said to symbolize the vital role that the church played in the life of Ukrainian Americans.

References

Members of the Ukrainian Greek Catholic Church
American people of Ukrainian descent
1857 births
1926 deaths